Abortion in Vermont is legal in all stages of pregnancy. A 2014 Pew Research Center poll showed 70% of adults in the state believed abortion should be legal in most or all cases, the second highest percentage in the country. The state funds abortions deemed medically necessary for low-income women via Medicaid.

In November 2022, voters overwhelmingly passed Proposal 5, the Reproductive Liberty Amendment, becoming one of the first three states, along with California and Michigan, to amend their constitutions to explicitly include protections for abortion rights.

History

Legislative history 
By the end of the 1800s, all states in the Union except Louisiana had medical exceptions in their legislative bans on abortions. In the 19th century, bans on abortion by state legislatures were largely about protecting the life of the mother given the number of deaths caused by abortions; state governments saw themselves as looking out for the lives of their citizens.

As of 2013, California, Oregon, Montana, Vermont, and New Hampshire allow qualified non-physician health professionals, such as physicians' assistants, nurse practitioners, and certified nurse midwives, to do first-trimester aspiration abortions and to prescribe drugs for medical abortions.

In February 2019, Vermont House Human Services and Judiciary committees held public hearings about abortion in relation to H.57, a bill to establish reproductive rights in state law. Proposal 5, the Reproductive Liberty Amendment, an amendment to the state constitution to codify abortion rights, was passed by the state senate. Receiving endorsements from Republican Governor Phil Scott, Planned Parenthood, and ACLU Vermont, the amendment went before voters in November 2022 and overwhelmingly passed, with about 77% voting in favor.

Amendment text

Judicial history 
In 1972, the Vermont Supreme Court issued a ruling that effectively ended abortion restrictions in the state. The US Supreme Court's decision in 1973's Roe v. Wade meant the state could no longer regulate abortion in the first trimester.  The Supreme Court overturned Roe v. Wade in Dobbs v. Jackson Women's Health Organization in 2022, returning the matter to the states.

Clinic history 

Between 1982 and 1992, the number of abortion clinics in the state declined by three, going from nineteen in 1982 to sixteen in 1992. In 2014, there were six abortion clinics in the state. 64% of the counties in the state did not have an abortion clinic. That year, 38% of women in the state aged 15–44 lived in a county without an abortion clinic. In 2017, there were twelve Planned Parenthood clinics, of which six offered abortion services, in a state with a population of 136,459 women aged 15–49.

Statistics 
In the period between 1972 and 1974, there were zero recorded illegal abortion deaths in the state. In 1990, 67,000 women in the state faced the risk of an unintended pregnancy. In 2013, among white women aged 15–19, there were 190 abortions, 0 abortions for black women aged 15–19, 10 abortions for Hispanic women aged 15–19, and 10 abortions for women of all other races. In 2014, 70% of adults said in a poll by the Pew Research Center that abortion should be legal in all or most cases. In 2017, the state had an infant mortality rate of 5.9 deaths per 1,000 live births.

Abortion financing 
17 states including Vermont use their own funds to cover all or most medically necessary abortions sought by low-income women under Medicaid, 13 of which are required by State court orders to do so. In 2010, the state had 699 publicly funded abortions, of which all were state funded and none were federally funded.

Abortion rights views and activities

Protests 

Throughout the 2000s, women from the state participated in marches supporting abortion rights. One march was a part of a #StoptheBans movement in May 2019.

References 

Vermont
Healthcare in Vermont
Women in Vermont